Rakesh Babu is an Indian politician and a member of the Sixteenth Legislative Assembly of Uttar Pradesh in India. He represents the Tundla constituency of Uttar Pradesh and is a member of the Bahujan Samaj Party political party.

Early life and  education
Rakesh Babu was born in Firozabad district. He attended the  Dr. Bhimrao Ambedkar University and attained Master of Arts degree.

Political career
Rakesh Babu has been a MLA for two terms. He represented the Tundla constituency and is a member of the Bahujan Samaj Party political party.

Posts held

See also
 Sixteenth Legislative Assembly of Uttar Pradesh
 Tundla (Assembly constituency)
 Uttar Pradesh Legislative Assembly

References 

Bahujan Samaj Party politicians from Uttar Pradesh
Uttar Pradesh MLAs 2007–2012
Uttar Pradesh MLAs 2012–2017
People from Firozabad district
1960 births
Living people